Zurab Magomedovich Yevloyev (born 20 February 1980) is a former Russian professional football player.

Club career
He played in the Russian Football National League for FC Angusht Nazran in 2006.

References

External links
 Career summary by sportbox.ru

1980 births
Living people
Russian footballers
Association football forwards
FC Angusht Nazran players